Tama Maru No. 3 (Japanese: 第三玉丸) was an auxiliary minesweeper of the Imperial Japanese Navy during World War II.

History
Tama Maru No. 3 was laid down on 25 April 1936 at the Hikoshima shipyard of Mitsubishi Jukogyo K.K. at the behest of shipping company, Taiyo Hogei K.K. She was launched on 6 August 1936 and completed 27 September 1936. On 12 September 1941, she was requisitioned by the Imperial Japanese Navy and converted to an auxiliary minesweeper under Reserve Lieutenant (Junior Grade) Yamaguchi Atsutoshi (山口篤利). Yamaguchi served until 18 October 1943 when he was replaced by Reserve Lieutenant Yoshii Jiro (吉井次郎). She was sunk on 30 January 1944 at Kwajalein Atoll.

References

1936 ships
Ships built by Mitsubishi Heavy Industries
Maritime incidents in January 1944
World War II minesweepers of Japan
Mine warfare vessels of the Imperial Japanese Navy
Auxiliary ships of the Imperial Japanese Navy